The Juvenile Instructor was a magazine for members of the Church of Jesus Christ of Latter-day Saints (LDS Church). It began publication in 1866 as a private publication, but by the late 1860s served as the de facto publication of the LDS Church's Deseret Sunday School Union organization. It was an official periodical of the LDS Church from 1901 to 1929, after which the church replaced it with  The Instructor.

History
The Juvenile Instructor was issued monthly and was initially targeted toward the children and youth members of the LDS Church. It consisted of catechisms on the Bible, Book of Mormon, and Doctrine and Covenants; musical compositions; illustrations; stories; editorial teachings; and other aids to gospel instruction. It was the first magazine for children published in the United States west of the Mississippi River.

For much of its history, The Juvenile Instructor was owned by the Cannon family. Its first editor was George Q. Cannon, an LDS Church apostle. Cannon and his family continued to publish the magazine privately until January 1, 1901, when the Deseret Sunday School Union purchased the magazine and continued its publication. From 1901 to 1929, the magazine was considered the official publication of the church's Sunday School.

From 1881 to 1890, George Reynolds was an assistant editor of The Juvenile Instructor. In 1882, he wrote a series of popular articles in the magazine about Joseph Smith and the translation of the Book of Mormon.

Blog
In 2007, an academically leaning blog focused on the history of the Latter-day Saints was formed and named Juvenile Instructor with the original intention "to situate the study of Mormonism within wider frameworks, including American religious history, western history, gender history, and, on occasion, the history of the Republic of South Africa."

See also

List of Latter Day Saint periodicals

Notes

External links
Juvenile Instructor (PDF scans) courtesy of the Church History Library and the Internet Archive.
Juvenile Instructor, an LDS history-themed blog, part of the Mormon blogosphere.

1866 in Christianity
Defunct magazines published in the United States
Magazines disestablished in 1929
Magazines established in 1866
Religious works for children
Sunday School (LDS Church)
The Church of Jesus Christ of Latter-day Saints periodicals
Young people and the Church of Jesus Christ of Latter-day Saints
20th-century Mormonism
1866 establishments in Utah Territory
Magazines published in Utah